Kikuyu Kusini is an administrative ward in the Dodoma Urban district of the Dodoma Region of Tanzania. In 2016 the Tanzania National Bureau of Statistics report there were 6,493 people in the ward, from 5,974 in 2012.

References

Dodoma
Wards of Dodoma Region